Muhammad Ayaz Niazi (born; 1964 - 2 June 2020) (مولانا ډاکټر محمد ایاز نیازی) was an Afghan Islamic scholar, Khatib and Imam.

He was a professor of Islamic Law at Kabul University and Khatib at Wazir Akbar Khan Mosque.

Death
Niazi was killed on 2 June 2020 with three others in a bomb blast at Masjid Wazir Akbar Khan.

References

1964 births
2020 deaths
People from Badakhshan Province
Al-Azhar University alumni
Academic staff of Kabul University
Afghan Muslims
Afghan imams
Assassinations in Afghanistan